Tango Feroz: la leyenda de Tanguito is a 1993 Argentine drama musical film directed by Marcelo Piñeyro, his debut film. It is loosely based in the life of Tanguito, one of the first artists of Argentine rock ("Tanguito" is just a stage name, neither the artist nor the movie are related with Tango music). Fernan Mirás and Cecilia Dopazo, unknown to most spectators by that point, had the lead roles and became famous after the film's release. It was the most successful Argentinian movie of all time.

Tango Feroz centers on Tanguito's drug addiction, his love relationship with Mariana, his friendship with Mauricio "Moris" Birabent, his madness and final years. The film does not include any of the songs written by the real Tanguito, such as his iconic "La balsa", as Piñeyro could not acquire the rights for doing so. Instead, it uses many other classic songs of Argentine Rock. Ulises Butrón sang the hit song written for the movie, "El amor es más fuerte", in the scenes played by Mirás as well as the soundtrack.

Cast
 Fernán Mirás as Tanguito
 Cecilia Dopazo as Mariana
 David Masajnik as Ruso
 Imanol Arias as Ángel
 Cristina Banegas as Mariana's mother
 Antonio Birabent as Mauricio 'Moris' Birabent
 Leonardo Sbaraglia as Pedro
 Federico D'Elía
 Héctor Alterio as Lobo
 Ernesto Alterio
 Carola Molina
 Humberto Serrano
 Mirna Suárez

Reception
In its opening weekend, Tango Feroz grossed $249,111 from 45,203 admissions at seven screens in Buenos Aires, the biggest Argentine opener of the last 10 years. The film grossed $4,225,000 in Argentina, a record for an Argentinian film at the time, and was the second highest-grossing for the year behind Jurassic Park with $4.6 million.

Awards
Tango Feroz won the 1994 Argentinian Film Critics Association Awards for Best First Film and Best Music. It was also nominated as Best Film, but didn't get the award. Marcelo Piñeyro also won the 1993 Torino International Film Festival of Young Cinema in the International Feature Film Competition, and got the second place at the 1993 Havana Film Festival.

References

External links
 

1993 films
Argentine biographical films
Films shot in Buenos Aires
1990s Argentine films